White River Township is one of twenty-five townships in Barry County, Missouri, United States. As of the 2000 census, its population was 2,434.

White River Township was established in 1841.

Geography
It contains three cemeteries: McGuire, Viney and Viola.

The streams of Owl Creek, Rock Creek, Sweetwater Creek and Viney Creek run through this township.

Transportation
White River Township contains two airports or landing strips: Bel-Voir Acres Airport and Table Rock Airport.

References

 USGS Geographic Names Information System (GNIS)

External links
 City-Data.com

Townships in Barry County, Missouri
Townships in Missouri
1841 establishments in Missouri